The Ceniceros government was the regional government of La Rioja led by President José Ignacio Ceniceros. It was formed in July 2015 after the regional election and ended in August 2019 following the regional election.

Government

References

2015 establishments in La Rioja (Spain)
2019 disestablishments in La Rioja (Spain)
Cabinets established in 2015
Cabinets disestablished in 2019
Cabinets of La Rioja (Spain)